Sir Frescheville Holles (8 June 1642 – 28 May 1672) was an English Royal Navy officer and politician who sat in the House of Commons from 1666 to 1672. He was killed in action fighting in the Anglo-Dutch war.

Holles was the son of Gervase Holles and his second wife Elizabeth Molesworth. Gervase Holles had been Mayor and MP for Grimsby.

Frescheville Holles was a major in the Westminster militia and commanded a privateer called the Panther. He was recommended for the navy by George Monck, 1st Duke of Albemarle. and lost an arm at the Four Days Battle in 1666 while commanding HMS Antelope. He was knighted in June the same year (1666).

In 1667, Holles was elected Member of Parliament for Grimsby in the Cavalier Parliament. In 1667 he was also made a captain in the 2nd Foot Guards but lost his command in 1669, becoming Mayor of Grimsby that year instead in the footsteps of his father. In January, 1672 he was elected a Fellow of the Royal Society.

In March 1672, he and Sir Robert Holmes sailed from Portsmouth and attacked the Dutch Smyrna convoy in the English Channel on its return home. This foray had official sanction and led to the Third Dutch War. Holles was in command of HMS Cambridge at the Battle of Solebay on 28 May 1672 when he was killed at the age of 29. He was given a funeral in Westminster Abbey and was buried in St Edmund's chapel in an unmarked grave.

Family
Holles married Jane, daughter of Richard Lewis, and widow of  Valentine Crome, a London merchant.

References

1642 births
1672 deaths
Members of the Parliament of England for Great Grimsby
Knights Bachelor
Royal Navy officers
Mayors of Grimsby
English MPs 1661–1679
English military personnel killed in action
Place of birth missing
Royal Navy personnel of the Second Anglo-Dutch War
Fellows of the Royal Society
Royal Navy personnel of the Third Anglo-Dutch War
Burials at Westminster Abbey